Coleophora schibendyella is a moth of the family Coleophoridae. It is found in the southern Ural Mountains and the lower Volga region in Russia.

The wingspan is 12.5–14 mm. Adults have a white thorax with light beige hue. The head is pale beige. The forewings are pale beige, irrorated (speckled) with light brown and brown scales and with broad, creamy white longitudinal stripes. The fringes are whitish-light beige. The hindwings and fringes are light greyish brown.

Etymology
The specific name refers to the Schibendy valley, which is one of the collecting sites of the taxon.

References

schibendyella
Moths of Europe
Moths described in 2007